The history of the Jews in Ethiopia refers to people in Ethiopia who practice Judaism or have Jewish ancestry.  This history goes back millennia.  The largest Jewish group in Ethiopia is the Beta Israel, also known as Ethiopian Jews. Offshoots of the Beta Israel include the Beta Abraham and the Falash Mura, Ethiopian Jews who were converted to Christianity, some of whom have reverted to Judaism. Addis Ababa is home to a small community of Adeni Jews. Chabad also maintains a presence in Addis Ababa.

Historical

Political independence (4th century – 1632)

According to the Beta Israel tradition, the Jewish kingdom of Beta Israel, later called the kingdom of Gondar, was initially established after Ezana was crowned as the Emperor of Axum in 325 CE. Ezana, who was educated in his childhood by the missionary Frumentius, declared Christianity as the religion of the Ethiopian empire after he was crowned. The inhabitants who practiced Judaism and refused to convert to Christianity began revolting; this group was referred to as "Beta Israel" by the emperor. Following civil war between the Jewish population and the Christian population, the Beta Israel appear to have forged an independent state, either in northern western Ethiopia or the eastern region of Northern Sudan. By the 13th century, the Beta Israel had already moved to the more easily defensible mountains to the northwest of the Christianized region of the plains.<ref>Kaplan, "The Beta Israel, p. 408</ref> The kingdom was located in the Semien Mountains region and the Dembia region – situated to the north of Lake Tana and south of the Tekezé River. They made their main city at Gondar, crowned their first king, Phineas, a descendant of the Jewish High Priest Zadok, and started a period of territorial expansion eastward and southward.

During the mid-9th century, the empire of Aksum began a new expansion, which led to an armed conflict between the Empire forces and the Beta Israel forces. The Beta Israel kingdom under King Gideon IV managed to defeat the Axum forces. During the battle, King Gideon IV was killed. As a result, Gideon's daughter Judith inherited the kingdom from her father and took command.

Queen Judith signed a pact with the Agaw tribes which were pagans. Around 960, The large confederation led by Queen Judith, which included both forces of the Agaw tribes and the Beta Israel forces, invaded the capital city of Axum, conquering and destroying it (including many churches and monasteries which were burned and destroyed) and imposed the Jewish rule over Axum. In addition, the Axumite throne was snatched and the forces of Queen Judith sacked and burned the Debre Damo monastery which at the time was a treasury and a prison for the male relatives of the emperor of Ethiopia, killing all of the potential heirs of the emperor.

The Golden Age of the Beta Israel kingdom took place, according to the Ethiopian tradition, between the years 858–1270, in which the Jewish kingdom flourished. During that period, the world Jewry heard for the first time the stories of Eldad ha-Dani, who either visited the kingdom or heard many accounts of it in his own Jewish kingdom of pastoralists. Even Marco Polo and Benjamin of Tudela mention an independent Ethiopian Jewish kingdom in the writings from that period. This period ends with the rise of the Christian Solomonic dynasty; in 1270 the dynasty was "restored" after the crowning of a monarch who claimed descent from the single royal prince who managed to escape Queen Judith's uprising. For the next three centuries, the Solomonic dynasty emperors conducted several long ongoing series of armed confrontations with the Jewish kingdom.

In 1329, Emperor Amda Seyon campaigned in the northwest provinces of Semien, Wegera, Tselemt, Tsegede and Dembiya in which many had been converting to Judaism and where the Beta Israel had been gaining prominence. He sent troops there to fight people "like Jews" (Ge'ez ከመ:አይሁድ kama ayhūd). There is no evidence for a unified Beta Israel dominion at this time. Judaized groups were dispersed, politically divided,- some being allied to the Emperor.

Emperor Yeshaq (1414–1429) who had allies among the Beta Israel invaded the Jewish kingdom, annexed it, and began to exert religious pressure. Yeshaq divided the occupied territories of the Jewish kingdom into three provinces, which were controlled by commissioners appointed by him. He reduced the Jews' social status below that of Christians and forced the Jews to convert or lose their land. It would be given away as rist, a type of land qualification that rendered it forever inheritable by the recipient and not transferable by the Emperor. Yeshaq decreed, "He who is baptized in the Christian religion may inherit the land of his father, otherwise let him be a Falāsī." This may have been the origin for the term "Falasha" (falāšā, "wanderer", or "landless person"). This term is considered derogatory to Ethiopian Jews.

In 1435, Elijah of Ferrara recounted meeting an Ethiopian Jew in Jerusalem in a letter to his children. The man told him of the ongoing conflict of his independent nation with the Christian Abyssinians; he relayed some of the principals of his faith, which, Ferrara concluded, balanced between Karaite and Rabbinical Judaism. His people were not familiar with the Talmud and did not observe Hanukkah, but their canon contained the book of Esther and they had an oral interpretation of the Torah. Ferrara further recorded that they had their own language, that the journey from their land lasted six months, and that the biblical Gozan river was found within their borders.

By 1450, the Jewish kingdom managed to annex back the territories it lost beforehand and began preparing to fight the armies of the emperor. The Beta Israel forces invaded the Ethiopian Empire in 1462, but lost the campaign, and many of its military forces were killed. Later on, the forces of the Ethiopian emperor invaded the kingdom in the region of Begemder, and massacred many of the Jews in that region throughout a period of seven years. The Emperor Zara Yaqob (reigned 1434–1468) even proudly added the title "Exterminator of the Jews" to his name. Although the area of the kingdom became significantly smaller afterwards, the Jews were able to eventually restore their mountain kingdom.

In the 16th century, the Chief Rabbi of Egypt, David ben Solomon ibn Abi Zimra (also called Radbaz, ca.1479-1573), proclaimed that in terms of halakha the Ethiopian Beta Israel community are ethnically Jewish.

Between the years 1529 until 1543, the Muslim Adal Sultanate armies, with the assistance of forces from the Ottoman Empire, fought the Ethiopian Empire, and came close to defeating Ethiopia, and converting its subjects to Islam. During that time period, the Jews made a pact with the Ethiopian Empire. The leaders of the Kingdom of Beta Israel changed their alliance during the war, and began supporting the Muslim Adal Sultanate armies. However, the Adal Sultanate armies felt strong enough to ignore this offer of support, and killed many of its members. As a result, the leaders of the Beta Israel kingdom turned to the Ethiopian empire and their allies, and continued the fight against them. They conquered different regions of the Jewish kingdom, severely damaged its economy, and requested their assistance in winning back the regions lost to the Adal Sultanate. The forces of the Ethiopian empire did succeed eventually in conquering the Muslims and preventing Ahmed Gragn from conquering Ethiopia. Nevertheless, the Ethiopian Christian empire decided to declare war against the Jewish Kingdom, giving as their justification the Jewish leaders' change of positions during the Ethiopian–Adal War. With the assistance of Portuguese forces from the Order of the Jesuits, the Ethiopian empire, under the rule of Emperor Gelawdewos, invaded the Jewish kingdom, and executed the Jewish king Joram. As a result of this battle, the areas of the kingdom became significantly smaller, and included now only the region of the Semien Mountains.

After the execution of King Joram, King Radi became the leader of the Beta Israel kingdom. King Radi also fought against the Ethiopian Empire, which at that period of time was ruled by Emperor Menas. The forces of the Jewish kingdom managed to conquer the area south of the kingdom, and strengthened their defenses in the Semien Mountains. The battles against the forces of Emperor Menas were successful, as the Ethiopian empire forces were eventually defeated by the Beta Israel army.

During the reign (1563–1597) of Emperor Sarsa Dengel, that invaded the Beta Israel kingdom with the use of Cannons that He recently captured from the ottomans. the forces of the Ethiopian empire besieged the Jewish kingdom. The Jews survived the siege, but at the end of the siege, their King Goshen was executed, and many of his soldiers, as well as many other Beta Israel members, decided to commit mass suicide.

During the reign of Susenyos I, who publicly converted to Catholicism in 1622, the Ethiopian empire waged war against the Jewish kingdom, and managed to conquer the entire kingdom and annex it to the Ethiopian empire by 1627. The vanquished Jews were forced to baptize, and denied the right to own land.

Gondar period (1632–1855)

After the Beta Israel autonomy in Ethiopia ended in the 1620s, Emperor Susenyos I confiscated their lands and forcibly baptized others. In addition, Jewish writings and religious books were burned and the practice of any form of Jewish religion was forbidden in Ethiopia. As a result of this period of oppression, much traditional Jewish culture and practice was lost or changed.

Nonetheless, the Beta Israel community appears to have continued to flourish during this period. The capital of Ethiopia, Gondar, in Dembiya, was surrounded by Beta Israel lands. The Beta Israel served as craftsmen, masons, and carpenters for the Emperors from the 16th century onwards. Such roles had been shunned by Ethiopians as lowly and less honorable than farming. According to contemporary accounts by European visitors, Portuguese merchants and diplomats, French, British, and other travellers, the Beta Israel numbered about one million persons in the 17th century. These accounts also recounted that some knowledge of Hebrew persisted among the people in the 17th century. For example, Manoel de Almeida, a Portuguese diplomat and traveller of the day, wrote that:

The sources of De Almeida's knowledge are not spelled out, but they at least reflect contemporary views. His comments regarding the Hebrew knowledge of the Beta Israel of that time is very significant: it could not have come from recent intercourse with Jews elsewhere, so it indicates deep antiquity to Beta Israel traditions, at least at that time, before their literature was taken away from them and demolished by the later conquering Christians. (The more sceptical school of historians, whose views are discussed above, deny that the Ethiopian Jews ever knew Hebrew; they certainly have no Hebrew texts remaining, and have been forced in recent centuries to use the Christian "Old Testament" in Ge'ez after their own literature was destroyed.) It is also of interest that he mentions more Jewish communities dwelling beyond Ethiopia in the Sudan. As so often in such medieval hearsay accounts, however, loose claims are made that may not be accurate. The Beta Israel were not predominantly of the Arabic race, for instance, but he may have meant the term loosely or meant that they also knew Arabic.

The isolation of the Beta Israel community in Ethiopia, and their continuing use of some Hebrew, was also reported by the Scottish explorer James Bruce who published his travelogue Travels to Discover the Source of the Nile in Edinburgh in 1790.

The Beta Israel lost their relative economic advantage in the late 18th and early 19th centuries,  during the Zemene Mesafint, a period of recurring civil strife. Although the capital was  nominally in Gondar during this time period, the decentralization of government and dominance by  regional capitals resulted in a decline and exploitation of Beta Israel by local rulers.  No longer was there a strong central government interested in and capable of protecting them. During this period, the Jewish religion was effectively lost for some forty years, before being restored in the 1840s by Abba Widdaye, the preeminent monk of Qwara.

16th-century rabbinic view

Rabbi David ibn Zimra of Egypt (1479–1573), when asked about a certain black-skinned woman taken captive from Ethiopia (Judeo-Arabic: אל-חבאש) and sold to a Jew in Egypt (the woman claiming to be of Jewish descent), wrote of the impressions the Jews of Egypt had at that time of their Ethiopian counterparts who claimed Jewish descent:
   
...Lo! the matter is well-known that there are perpetual wars between the kings of Kush, which has three kingdoms; part of which belonging to the Ishmaelites, and part of which to the Christians, and part of which to the Israelites from the tribe of Dan. In all likelihood, they are from the sect of Sadok and Boethus, who are [now] called Karaites, since they know only a few of the biblical commandments, but are unfamiliar with the Oral Law, nor do they light the Sabbath candle. War ceases not from amongst them, and every day they take captives from one another...

In the same responsum, he concludes that if the Ethiopian Jewish community wished to return to rabbinic Judaism, they would be received and welcomed into the fold, just as the Karaites who returned to the teachings of the Rabbanites in the time of Rabbi Abraham ben Maimonides.

Modern history
The contemporary history of the Beta Israel community begins with the reunification of Ethiopia in the mid-19th century during the reign of Tewodros II. At that time, the Beta Israel population was estimated at between 200,000 and 350,000 people.

 Christian missions and the Rabbinical reformation 

Despite occasional contacts in an earlier stage, the West only became well-aware of the existence of the Beta Israel community when they came in contact through the Protestant missionaries of the "London Society for Promoting Christianity Amongst the Jews" which specialized in the conversion of Jews. The organization began its operating in Ethiopia in 1859. The Protestant missionaries, who worked under the direction of a converted Jew named Henry Aaron Stern, converted many of the Beta Israel community to Christianity. Between 1859 and 1922, about 2,000 Beta Israel members converted to Ethiopian Christianity (they did not convert to Protestantism due to an agreement the Protestant missionaries had with the government of Ethiopia). The relatively low number of conversions is partly explained by the strong reaction to the conversions from religious leadership of the Beta Israel community. The Beta Israel members who were converted to Christianity are known today as "Falash Mura".

The Protestant missionaries' activities in Ethiopia provoked European Jewry. As a result, several European rabbis proclaimed that they recognized the Jewishness of the Beta Israel community, and eventually in 1868 the organization "Alliance Israélite Universelle" decided to send the Jewish-French Orientalist Joseph Halévy to Ethiopia in order to study the conditions of the Ethiopian Jews. Upon his return to Europe, Halévy made a very favorable report of the Beta Israel community in which he called for world Jewish community to save the Ethiopian Jews, to establish Jewish schools in Ethiopia, and even suggested to bring thousands of Beta Israel members to settle in Ottoman Syria (a dozen years before the actual establishment of the first Zionist organization).

Nevertheless, after a brief period in which the media coverage generated a great interest in the Beta Israel community, the interest among the Jewish communities worldwide declined. This happened mainly because serious doubts still remained about the Jewishness of the Beta Israel community, and because the Alliance Israélite Universelle organization did not comply with Halévy's recommendations.

Between 1888 and 1892, northern Ethiopia experienced a devastating famine. The famine was caused by rinderpest that killed the majority of all cattle (see 1890s African rinderpest epizootic). Conditions worsened with cholera outbreaks (1889–1892), a typhus epidemic, and a major smallpox epidemic (1889–1890).

About one-third of the Ethiopian population died during that period.El Niño and Drought Early Warning in Ethiopia  It is estimated that between a half to two-thirds of the Beta Israel community died during that period.

The myth of the lost tribes in Ethiopia intrigued Jacques Faitlovitch, a former student of Joseph Halévy at the Ecole des Hautes Etudes in Paris. In 1904, Faitlovitch decided to lead a new mission in northern Ethiopia. Faitlovitch obtained funding from the Jewish philanthropist Edmond de Rothschild, traveled and lived among the Ethiopian Jews. In addition, Faitlovitch managed to disrupt the efforts of the Protestant missionaries to convert the Ethiopian Jews, who at the time attempted to persuade the Ethiopian Jews that all the Jews in the world believe in Jesus. Between the years 1905–1935, he brought out 25 young Ethiopian Jewish boys, whom he planted in the Jewish communities of Europe, for example Salomon Yesha, Taamerat Ammanuel, Abraham Adgeh, Yona Bogale, and Tadesse Yacob.

Following his visit in Ethiopia, Faitlovitch created an international committee for the Beta Israel community, popularized the awareness of their existence through his book Notes de voyage chez les Falashas (1905), and raised funds to enable the establishment of schools in their villages.

In 1908, the chief rabbis of 45 countries made a joint statement officially declaring that Ethiopian Jews were indeed Jewish.

The Jewishness of the Beta Israel community became openly supported amongst the majority of the European Jewish communities during the early 20th century.

In 1921, Abraham Isaac Kook, the first Ashkenazi chief rabbi of the British Mandate for Palestine, recognized the Beta Israel community as Jews.

The Italian period, World War II and the post war period

In 1935, armed forces of the Kingdom of Italy, headed by the fascist leader Benito Mussolini, invaded and occupied Ethiopia. 

The Italian regime showed hostility towards the Jews of Ethiopia. The racial laws which were enacted in Italy were also applied to Italian East Africa. Mussolini attempted to reach an agreement with Britain which would recognize Italian East Africa, during which Mussolini proposed to solve the "Jewish problem" in Europe and in Palestine by resettling the Jews in the north-west Ethiopian districts of Gojjam and Begemder, along with the Beta Israel community. The proposed Jewish state was to be federally united with the Italian Empire. Mussolini's plan was never implemented.

When the State of Israel was established in 1948, many Ethiopian Jews began contemplating immigrating to Israel. Nevertheless, the Emperor Haile Selassie refused to grant the Ethiopian Jewish population permission to leave his empire.

Early illegal emigration and the official Israeli recognition
Between the years 1965 and 1975, a relatively small group of Ethiopian Jews immigrated to Israel. The Beta Israel immigrants in that period were mainly a very few men who had studied and come to Israel on a tourist visa, and then remained in the country illegally.

Some supporters in Israel who recognized their Jewishness decided to assist them. These supporters began organizing associations, including one under the direction of Ovadia Hazzi, a Yemeni Jew and former sergeant in the Israeli army who married a wife from the Beta Israel community after the Second World War. Some of the illegal immigrants managed to regularize their status with the Israeli authorities through the assistance of these support associations. Some agreed to "convert" to Judaism, which helped them to regularize their personal status and thus remain in Israel. Those who had regularized their status often brought their families to Israel as well.

In 1973, Ovadia Hazzi officially raised the question of the Jewishness of the Beta Israel to the Israeli Sephardi rabbi Ovadia Yosef. The rabbi, who cited a rabbinic ruling from the 16th century Radbaz and asserted that the Beta Israel are descended from the lost tribe of Dan, acknowledged their Jewishness in February 1973. This ruling was initially rejected by the Ashkenazi Chief Rabbi Shlomo Goren, who eventually changed his opinion on the matter in 1974.

In April 1975, the Israeli government of Yitzhak Rabin officially accepted the Beta Israel as Jews, for the purpose of the Law of Return (an Israeli act that grants all the Jews in the world the right to immigrate to Israel).

Later on, Israeli Prime Minister Menachem Begin obtained clear rulings from Ovadia Yosef that they were descendants of the Ten Lost Tribes. The Chief Rabbinate of Israel did, however, initially require them to undergo pro forma'' Jewish conversions, to remove any doubt as to their Jewish status.

Ethiopian Civil War

After a period of civil unrest, on September 12, 1974, a pro-communist military junta, known as the "Derg" ("committee"), seized power after ousting the emperor Haile Selassie I. The Derg installed a government which was socialist in name and military in style. Lieutenant Colonel Mengistu Haile Mariam assumed power as head of state and Derg chairman. Mengistu's years in office were marked by a totalitarian-style government, and the country's massive militarization, financed by the Soviet Union and the Eastern Bloc, and assisted by Cuba. Communism was officially adopted by the new regime during the late 1970s and early 1980s.

As a result, the new regime gradually began to embrace anti-religious and anti-Israeli positions, as well as showing hostility towards the Jews of Ethiopia.

Towards the mid-1980s, Ethiopia underwent a series of famines, exacerbated by adverse geopolitics and civil wars, which eventually resulted in the deaths of hundreds of thousands. As a result, the lives of hundreds of thousands of Ethiopians, including the Beta Israel community, became untenable and a large part tried to escape the war and the famine by fleeing to neighboring Sudan.

Concern for the fate of the Ethiopian Jews and fear for their well-being contributed eventually to the Israeli government's official recognition of the Beta Israel community as Jews in 1975, for the purpose of the Law of Return. Civil war in Ethiopia prompted the Israeli government to airlift most of the Beta Israel population in Ethiopia to Israel in several covert military rescue operations which took place from the 1980s until the early 1990s.

Addis Ababa at one point had a prominent Adenite community. Most of them left fairly quickly, with many making aliyah, however some stayed and established synagogues and Hebrew schools. By 1986, there were only six Adeni families left in the city, and almost all of their property was seized by the Mengistu regime.

Ethiopia–Israel relations

Ethiopia has an embassy in Tel Aviv; the ambassador is also accredited to the Holy See, Greece and Cyprus. Israel has an embassy in Addis Ababa; the ambassador is also accredited to Rwanda and Burundi. Israel has been one of Ethiopia's most reliable suppliers of military assistance, supporting different Ethiopian governments during the Eritrean War of Independence.

In 2012, an Ethiopian-born Israeli, Belaynesh Zevadia, was appointed Israeli ambassador to Ethiopia.

During the imperial era, Israeli advisers trained paratroops and counterinsurgency units belonging to the Fifth Division (also called the Nebelbal, 'Flame', Division). In December 1960, a section of the Ethiopian army attempted a coup whilst the Emperor Haile Sellassie I was on a state visit in Brazil. Israel intervened, so that the Emperor could communicate directly with general Abbiye. General Abbiye and his troops remained loyal to the Emperor, and the rebellion was crushed.

In the early 1960s, Israel started helping the Ethiopian government in its campaigns against the Eritrean Liberation Front (ELF). The Ethiopian government portrayed the Eritrean rebellion as an Arab threat to the African region, an argument that convinced the Israelis to side with the Ethiopian government in the conflict. Israel trained counter-insurgency forces and the Governor General of Eritrea, Asrate Medhin Kassa, had an Israeli Military Attaché as his advisor. An Israeli colonel was put in charge of a military training school at Decamare and the training of the Ethiopian Marine Commando Forces. By 1966, there were around 100 Israeli military advisors in Ethiopia.

Ethiopian Prime Minister Aklilu Habte-Wold began seeking political support for breaking relations with Israel after the OAU summit. After long discussions, the cabinet voted to sever diplomatic links with Israel. The decision was however censored by a veto from the Emperor. Even after Ethiopia broke diplomatic relations with Israel in 1973, Israeli military aid continued after the Derg military junta came to power and included spare parts and ammunition for U.S.-made weapons and service for U.S.-made F-5 jet fighters. Israel also maintained a small group of military advisers in Addis Ababa. In 1978, however, when the Israeli Minister of Foreign Affairs Moshe Dayan admitted that Israel had been providing security assistance to Ethiopia, Mengistu Haile Mariam expelled all Israelis so that he might preserve his relationship with radical Arab states such as Libya and South Yemen. In 1983, for example, Israel provided communications training, and in 1984 Israeli advisers trained the Presidential Guard and Israeli technical personnel served with the police. Some Western observers believed that Israel provided military assistance to Ethiopia in exchange for Mengistu's tacit cooperation during Operation Moses in 1984, in which 10,000 Beta Israel (Ethiopian Jews) were evacuated to Israel. In 1985 Israel reportedly sold Addis Ababa at least US$20 million in Soviet-made munitions and spare parts captured in Lebanon. According to the Eritrean People's Liberation Front (EPLF), the Mengistu regime received US$83 million worth of Israeli military aid in 1987, and Israel deployed some 300 military advisers to Ethiopia. Additionally, the EPLF claimed that thirty-eight Ethiopian pilots had gone to Israel for training. In return for this aid, Ethiopia permitted the emigration of the Beta Israel. Departures in the spring reached about 500 people a month before Ethiopian officials adopted new emigration procedures that reduced the figure by more than two-thirds. The following year, Jerusalem and Addis Ababa negotiated another agreement whereby Israel provided agricultural, economic, and health assistance. Also, in May 1991, as the Mengistu regime neared its end, Israel paid US$35 million in cash to allow nearly 15,000 Beta Israel to emigrate from Ethiopia to Israel.

Emigration to Israel

See also
 Falash Mura
 Beta Abraham
 List of synagogues in Ethiopia
 Slavery in Ethiopia

References

Ethiopia
Jews